Maitreyi Pushpa (Hindi: मैत्रेयी पुष्पा; born 30 November 1944), is a Hindi fiction writer.  An eminent writer in Hindi, Maitreyi Pushpa has ten novels and seven short story collections to her credit She also writes prolifically for newspapers on current issues concerning women, and adopts a questioning, daring and challenging stance in her writings. She is best known for her Chak, Alma Kabutari, Jhoola Nat and an autobiographical novel Kasturi Kundal Base.

Early life
Maitreyi Pushpa was born in Sikurra village, Aligarh district. She spent her childhood and early years in Khilli, another village in Bundelkhand near Jhansi. She did her post graduation in Hindi at Bundelkhand College, Jhansi.

Career
Maitreyi Pushpa has authored seven collections of short stories and ten novels besides writing regular column in weekly Rashtriya Sahara.

The Delhi government proposed her name for the post of Delhi Commission for Women (DCW) chairperson on 29 January 2014.

Writing style
One writer refers to her powerful idiomatic language and uninhibited treatment.

Selected works

Story Collections
Chinhaar
Goma hansti hai
Peyaari ka sapna
Lalmaniyaan
Fighter ki Diary
Samagr kahaniyan ab tak
10 Pratinidhi Kahaniyan

Novels
Gunaah Begunaah
Kahi Isuri Phaag
Triya hath
Betavaa behti rahi
Idannammam
Chaak
Jhoola Nut
Alma Kabootri
Vision
Aganpaakhi
Farishtey nikle

Autobiographies
Gudiya bheetar gudiya
Kasturi Kundal base
Ye safar tha ki mukaam tha

Drama
Mandakranta

Women discourses
Khuli khidkiyaan
Suno maalik suno
Charcha hamara
Awaaz
Tabdeel Nigahen

Filmography

Telefilm
"Vasumati ki chitthi", based on the story "Faisla"

Teleserial
"Manda har yug main"

Awards and recognition

SAARC Literary Award for outstanding writing (2001)
Vanmaali Samman (2011)

See also
 List of Indian writers
 Mandakranta Sen
 Tapan Kumar Pradhan

References

External links
http://maitreyipushpa.com/
http://www.jagranjosh.com/current-affairs/वनमाली-सम्मान-2011-के-लिए-मैत्रेयी-पुष्पा-चयनित-1298445345-2
http://news.webindia123.com/news/articles/India/20110208/1684878.html

https://web.archive.org/web/20080719032227/http://www.india-today.com/itoday/19991213/maitreyi.html
https://web.archive.org/web/20080516094000/http://www.museindia.com/showcont.asp?id=245
https://archive.today/20130209085009/http://www.womenswriting.com/WomensWriting/AuthorProfileDetail.asp?AuthorID=8
https://web.archive.org/web/20071025041551/http://www.thp.org/snp/2003/essay1.htm

1944 births
Living people
Hindi-language writers
People from Aligarh district
People from Jhansi
Indian women novelists
Indian women short story writers
20th-century Indian novelists
Women writers from Uttar Pradesh
Novelists from Uttar Pradesh
20th-century Indian short story writers
20th-century Indian women writers